The Joseph Holt Ingraham House, also known as the Churchill House, is an historic house at 51 State Street in Portland, Maine.  Built in 1801, it is an important early design by architect Alexander Parris.  State Street, on which the house stands, was laid out by its first owner.   The house was listed on the National Register of Historic Places in 1973.

Description and history
The Ingraham House is located on the east side of Portland's West End neighborhood, on the northeast side of State Street, a shortway south of Danforth Street.  It is a three-story wood-frame structure, with a hip roof, clapboard siding, and a granite foundation.  The main facade is five bays wide, with symmetrical arrangement.  The main entrance is at the center sheltered by a hip-roofed portico with Doric columns.  The entry is flanked by sidelight windows and topped by an elliptical fanlight. Above the entrance is a three-part rectangular window on the second level, with a three-part half-round window on the third floor.  Windows are otherwise sash, with smaller windows on the third floor.  The interior of the house has little historic integrity; much of its original paneling was removed in the early 20th century, and was installed in Washington, DC's Blair House.

The house was designed by Alexander Parris, then early in his career, and was built in 1801 for Joseph Holt Ingraham, a silversmith and businessman.  The house, one of the oldest on the Portland peninsula, is one of three surviving works of Parris in the city, where he lived 1801-09 before achieving fame for his work in Boston and elsewhere.  Ingraham, who moved to Portland in 1768, is credited with building Ingraham Wharf (1793), and for laying out State Street, now one of the city's major cross-peninsula thoroughfares.  Later owners of the house include William Pitt Preble a justice of the Maine Supreme Judicial Court, and James M. Churchill, a merchant and shipowner.  In 1908 the house was converted into boarding house (called "The Churchill"); it is presently a multiunit apartment house.

See also
National Register of Historic Places listings in Portland, Maine

References

Houses on the National Register of Historic Places in Maine
Houses in Portland, Maine
West End (Portland, Maine)
National Register of Historic Places in Portland, Maine